Wavertree Playground, also known locally as The Mystery, was one of the first purpose-built public playgrounds in the United Kingdom. It is based in the Wavertree area of Liverpool, England.

History

In May 1895, a stately home called the Grange was demolished and it looked inevitable that the estate it was based within would be used as building for the increasing suburbs of Liverpool. However, the estate and some of the surrounding properties, comprising  of land, were purchased by an anonymous donor and presented to the City of Liverpool for use as a park. At the donor's suggestion, the new park was named Wavertree Playground, but was quickly nicknamed "The Mystery" by locals. An estimated 60,000 people attended the official opening on 7 September 1895, which involved a march past of schoolchildren, a gymnastics exhibition, Morris dancing, and a fireworks display.

A Liverpool Corporation day nursery had a building on the site on Grant Avenue but this was demolished about 1990.

Features and events
In addition to the playground, the park is home to Wavertree Sports Park with many sports facilities including Liverpool Aquatics Centre, sports hall, Lifestyles Fitness Centre, Liverpool Tennis Centre, all-weather pitch, bowling green and athletic track with grandstand. Liverpool Harriers and Athletic Club have based their headquarters at this centre since 1990.

Since 2 May 2019 the park has been the location for "The Mystery junior parkrun". This is a free, weekly, timed 2 kilometre event for children and young people aged 4 to 14. It takes place every Sunday at 9.00am and is run entirely by volunteers.

See also
 Wavertree
 Liverpool Wavertree (UK Parliament constituency)

References

External links

 Wavertree Athletics Centre
 The Mystery junior parkrun
 Liverpool Harriers & A.C.

Parks and commons in Liverpool
1895 establishments in England
Playgrounds